Renkomäki is the 22nd district of the city of Lahti, in the region of Päijät-Häme, Finland. It borders the districts of Nikkilä in the north, Ämmälä in the east and Jokimaa and Laune in the northwest, as well as the town of Orimattila in the south.

By a governmental decree made on 29 October 1954, Renkomäki was annexed to Lahti from Orimattila on 1 January 1956.

The population of the statistical district of Renkomäki was 2,736 in 2019.

References 

Districts of Lahti